Anagance is a community in the Canadian province of New Brunswick. It is situated in Cardwell, a parish of Kings County.

History

Anagance was founded in 1810. The locality was dependent on farming and received a railroad station during the latter half of the 19th century.

See also
List of communities in New Brunswick
List of people from Kings County, New Brunswick

References

Communities in Kings County, New Brunswick